Forced choice may refer to:
 Ipsative, a question that compares two options (in social science)
 Forcing (magic)